National Museum Taras Shevchenko (Ukrainian: Націона́льний музе́й Тара́са Шевче́нка) is a museum in Kyiv, the capital city of Ukraine, dedicated to the life and work of the painter and national poet, Taras Shevchenko.

History
The museum and its collection originated as part of an initiative by friends of Shevchenko to preserve his legacy shortly after his death. By 1897 the collection had grown and it was collectively transferred to the Museum of Ukrainian Antiquities, which was later merged into Chernihiv Historical Museum (uk). In 1926 the Shevchenko Institute in Kharkiv was founded, which became the home of the collection, and an initial Taras Shevchenko Museum operated as a section of the manuscripts department of the Institute.

In 1939, the Council of People's Commissars of the USSR decided to fund a major retrospective exhibition, and by 1940 the decision was made to found a central museum commemorating the artist. This exhibition was hosted at the Mariinskyi Palace and opened in 1941, but closed during the Second World War, with some works evacuated to Novosibirsk during the German occupation.

The museum opened in a specially converted building on 24 April 1949. From 1982 to 1989 the museum was closed for renovation and restoration work and the exhibits were housed in the area of ​​the Kyiv Pechersk Lavra. On 31 March 2001, the museum was awarded the status of a “national museum”.

Building
The museum is located in the Tereshchenka City Palace on Taras Shevchenko Boulevard in Kyiv. The building was constructed in 1841. In 1875 it was purchased by the Kiev sugar producer and philanthropist Mykola Tereshchenko (1819–1903) and was converted into an Italian Renaissance-style city palace by the architects Peter Fedorov and Ronald Tustanovsky.

Collection
The collection comprises over 72,000 objects, including works of art and archival material. Works from the collection have been loaned to museums in Latvia, Russia and the Czech Republic.

The museum exhibits works by famous painters, sculptors, writers and composers from Shevchenko's period, who are connected to his life and work. These include: Karl Bryullov, Mykhailo Derehus, Ivan Jishakevych, Vasyl Kasiyan, Fotij Krasyzkyj, Ivan Kramskoi, Mikhail Mikeshin, Ilya Repin, Mykola Samokysch, Ivan Soschenko, Vasily Sternberg, Karpo Trochymenko, Vasily Tropinin and Konstantin Trutovsky. Sculptors in the collection also include: Peter Kapschutschenko, Peter Clodt von Jürgensburg, Vladimir Beklemishev and others.

Notable staff
 Yulia Shilenko - Chief Curator

Gallery

Exterior

Interior

References

External links
 

1949 establishments in Ukraine
Museums established in 1949
Museums in Kyiv
Shevchenko, Taras
Shevchenko, Taras
Art museums and galleries in Ukraine
Literary museums in Ukraine
Taras Shevchenko